Lieutenant-Colonel William Robertson VC CBE (27 February 1865 – 6 December 1949) was a Scottish recipient of the Victoria Cross, the highest and most prestigious award for gallantry in the face of the enemy that can be awarded to British and Commonwealth forces.

Details
Robertson was 34 years old, and a sergeant-major in the 2nd Battalion, The Gordon Highlanders, British Army during the Second Boer War when the following action took place at the Battle of Elandslaagte for which he was awarded the VC.

Further information

Robertson was later commissioned into the Gordon Highlanders as a quartermaster with the rank of lieutenant. He was promoted captain in 1910, major in 1915, and lieutenant-colonel in 1917. In 1911 he is listed as "William Robertson VC", recruiting officer, living at 21 Lee Crescent in Portobello, Edinburgh.

He retired in 1920. After his retirement he became honorary treasurer of the Royal British Legion Scotland.

He died at home on 6 December 1949. He is buried in Portobello Cemetery with his family. The grave lies against the eastern boundary wall.

Family
He was married to Sarah Ferris (d.1950). Their children included William J Robertson (1892-1964) and Marion Robertson (1895-1971).

The medal
His Victoria Cross is displayed at the National War Museum of Scotland, Edinburgh Castle, Edinburgh, Scotland.

Freemasonry
He was a Scottish Freemason having been Initiated in Lodge Union, No.332, (Glasgow) on 20 March, Passed on 10 April and Raised on 1 May 1895. At a regular meeting of the Lodge on 20 March 1900 it was announced, to much applause, that Robertson had been awarded the VC.

References

Monuments to Courage (David Harvey, 1999)
The Register of the Victoria Cross (This England, 1997)
Scotland's Forgotten Valour (Graham Ross, 1995)
Victoria Crosses of the Anglo-Boer War (Ian Uys, 2000)

External links
Location of grave and VC medal (Lothian, Scotland)
angloboerwar.com profile

British recipients of the Victoria Cross
Second Boer War recipients of the Victoria Cross
Commanders of the Order of the British Empire
Gordon Highlanders soldiers
1865 births
1949 deaths
Gordon Highlanders officers
People from Dumfries
British Army personnel of the Second Boer War
British Army personnel of World War I
British Army recipients of the Victoria Cross